Kamard is a village in Jajrud Rural District, in the Jajrud District of Pardis County, Tehran Province, Iran.

Population
At the 2006 census, its population was 533, in 141 families.

References 

Populated places in Pardis County